Wheaton Franciscan Healthcare is a not-for-profit, Catholic health care system and housing organization sponsored by the Franciscan Sisters, Daughters of the Sacred Hearts of Jesus and Mary, of Wheaton, Illinois. The system became a subsidiary of Ascension Health when the two merged in 2015. It operates more than 100 health and shelter service organizations in Colorado, Illinois, Iowa, and Wisconsin. The system has 18 hospitals, three long-term care facilities, and 70 clinics. Wheaton has 21,626 employees, including 3,543 physicians.
The company's registered name is Wheaton Franciscan Services, Inc.

In 2016, the southeast Wisconsin operations and facilities of Wheaton Franciscan Healthcare became part of Ascension Health, Wisconsin.

Facilities

Hospitals, medical centers, and clinics
 Wheaton Franciscan - Elmbrook Memorial Campus, Brookfield, Wisconsin
 Wheaton Franciscan - St. Joseph Campus, Milwaukee, Wisconsin
 All Saints Hospital, Racine, Wisconsin
 Wheaton Franciscan Healthcare - Franklin, Franklin, Wisconsin
 Wheaton Franciscan Healthcare - St. Francis, Milwaukee, Wisconsin
 Midwest Orthopedic Specialty Hospital, Franklin, Wisconsin; joint-venture partnership
 Midwest Spine & Orthopedic Hospital, Wauwatosa, Wisconsin
 Wisconsin Heart Hospital, Milwaukee, Wisconsin
 Wheaton Franciscan - Brown Deer Campus Outpatient Center, Brown Deer, Wisconsin
 Wheaton Franciscan - Wauwatosa Campus Outpatient Center, Wauwatosa, Wisconsin
Covenant Medical Center, Waterloo, Iowa
 Sartori Memorial Hospital, Cedar Falls, Iowa
 Mercy Hospital of Franciscan Sisters, Oelwein, Iowa
 Marianjoy Rehabilitation Hospital, Wheaton, Illinois
 Rush Oak Park Hospital, Oak Park, Illinois; partnership with Rush University
 St. Catherine's Medical Center, Pleasant Prairie, Wisconsin; part of United Hospital System
 Kenosha Medical Center, Kenosha, Wisconsin; part of United Hospital System

Medical groups and health plans
 Covenant Clinic, several locations throughout Iowa
 Marianjoy Medical Group, Wheaton, Illinois; part of MarianJoy
 Network Health Plan of Wisconsin, Wisconsin
 Wheaton Franciscan Medical Group, Wisconsin

Home health care and nursing homes
 Assisi Homes, Colorado, Illinois, and Wisconsin
 Canticle Place, Illinois, part of Franciscan Ministries
 Catherine Marian Housing, Wisconsin, part of Franciscan Ministries
 Clare Gardens, Colorado, part of Franciscan Ministries
 Clare of Assisi Homes, Westminster, Colorado, part of Franciscan Ministries
 Dayspring Villa, Colorado, part of Franciscan Ministries
 Francis Heights, Colorado, part of Franciscan Ministries
 Franciscan Woods, Wisconsin
 Home Health Partners, Iowa
 Kenosha Seniors Ltd. Partnership, Wisconsin, part of Franciscan Ministries
 Lakeshore Manor, Wisconsin
 Marian Housing Center, Wisconsin, part of Franciscan Ministries
 Marian Park, Illinois, part of Franciscan Ministries
 Ridgeway Place, Iowa, part of Franciscan Ministries
 Starved Rock –LaSalle Manor Ltd. Partnership, Illinois, part of Franciscan Ministries
 The Terrace at St. Francis, Wisconsin
 Villa Maria, Colorado, part of Franciscan Ministries
 Villa St. Clare, Wisconsin, part of Franciscan Ministries
 Wheaton Franciscan Home Health and Hospice, Wisconsin

References

External links
Hospital Website
Covenant Medical Center
Wheaton Franciscan Healthcare of Iowa

Companies based in DuPage County, Illinois
Hospital networks in the United States
Catholic health care
Non-profit organizations based in Illinois
Wheaton, Illinois
Medical and health organizations based in Illinois
Catholic hospital networks in the United States